Freret may refer to:

People
 James Freret (1838–1897), American architect
 Nicolas Fréret (1688–1749), French scholar
 William Alfred Freret (1833–1911), American architect
 William Freret (1804–1864), twice mayor of New Orleans

Places
 Freret, New Orleans, a neighborhood of the city of New Orleans
 10303 Fréret, a minor planet